Inverarity has been the surname of various people:

Alison Inverarity (born 1970), Australian high jumper
Don Inverarity, Canadian politician
John Inverarity (born 1944), Australian cricketer
John Duncan Inverarity (1847 – 1923), British-Indian Barrister 
Jonathan Duncan Inverarity (1812/1813 – 1882), Anglo-Indian civil servant (father of above)
Pierce Inverarity, a fictional character from the novel The Crying of Lot 49